Herman David Oehlke (born March 1949) is an American politician who served as a Republican member of the North Dakota Senate from the 15th District.

Early life 
Oehlke graduated in 1971 from Concordia College with a Bachelor of Arts in Business and Hospital Management.

Personal life 
Oehlke lives in Devils Lake, North Dakota with his wife, Vicki, with whom he has two children.

References 

1949 births
Living people
Republican Party North Dakota state senators
21st-century American politicians